Lucy Mecklenburgh (born 24 August 1991) is an English television personality and model known for her appearances in the ITV2 reality series The Only Way Is Essex from 2010 to 2013. She later appeared in Tumble and Tour de Celeb.

Career

The Only Way Is Essex 
Mecklenburgh rose to fame as one of the cast members in the ITV2 reality series The Only Way is Essex. She remained on the series for three years, leaving after the tenth series.

Other work 
In 2014 Mecklenburgh appeared on Ladies of London (season 1, episode 7) modelling Caprice's line, By Caprice.

In 2015 Mecklenburgh released a clothing range with PrettyLittleThing and modelled in their advertising campaign. She also put her name to a collection for Ellesse sportswear. She opened her own shop, called Lucy's Boutique, and began a fitness business named Results With Lucy. In 2013, she was announced as a regular columnist for New! magazine. She is signed to Select modelling agency.

In 2014, Mecklenburgh also took part in the BBC One talent show Tumble with professional partner, Billy George. In 2015, her debut book, Be Body Beautiful, was published by Penguin. In 2016, she did a modelling campaign for Barry M.

Personal life 
Between 2010 and 2012, Mecklenburgh dated and was engaged to Mario Falcone, but this relationship ended in 2012. In 2017, she started dating actor Ryan Thomas, after they met participating in Celebrity Island with Bear Grylls together. They have been engaged since June 2019.

She gave birth to her first child, a boy on 7 March 2020 with fiancé Ryan. She gave birth to her second child, a girl, on 29 May 2022. Ryan has a daughter Scarlett from a previous relationship with his former co-star actress Tina O'Brien.

References

External links 
 

Living people
1992 births
English businesspeople
People from Brentwood, Essex
English television personalities
Participants in British reality television series